Charles "Charly" Fasel (21 May 1898 – 10 January 1984) was a Swiss ice hockey player who competed in the 1928 Winter Olympics.

He was a member of the Swiss ice hockey team, which won the bronze medal.

External links
profile

1898 births
1984 deaths
Ice hockey players at the 1928 Winter Olympics
Medalists at the 1928 Winter Olympics
Olympic bronze medalists for Switzerland
Olympic ice hockey players of Switzerland
Olympic medalists in ice hockey